La Spezia Centrale railway station is the main station of La Spezia, situated in the Piazza Medaglie d’Oro in the city centre.

Overview
It is the largest of four stations in the municipal area (there are also passenger stations at La Spezia Migliarina and Ca' di Boschetti and a goods station (La Spezia Marittima) inside the port of La Spezia). The station is located on the line from Genoa to Pisa, which runs along the Tyrrhenian Sea. It is also the terminus of the Pontremolese railway to Parma. It has four platforms.

History 
The station was inaugurated in 1887, replacing the Valdellora station that had served La Spezia since the railway was extended there from Massa on 4 August 1864. Valdellora station became a goods yard. The new Centrale railway station meant that the new neighborhood of Umbertino, then under construction, became the centre of La Spezia.

Gallery

See also

History of rail transport in Italy
List of railway stations in Tuscany
Rail transport in Italy
Railway stations in Italy

References

External links

 

Centrale station
Railway stations in Liguria
Railway stations opened in 1887